The University of Dhaka was established in 1921 as the first university in East Bengal. Following demands from Nawab Sir Khwaja Salimullah Bahadur and others, Viceroy Lord Hardinge proposed on 2 February 1912, that a new university should be established in this partition of Bengal.

Introduction
The University was established as compensation for the annulment of the 1905 Partition of Bengal. The partition had established East Bengal and Assam as a separate province, with Dhaka as its capital. However, the partition was abolished in 1911. In 1913, public opinion was solicited before the university scheme was given its final shape, and the Secretary of State approved it in December 1913. The first vice-chancellor of the university was Philip Joseph Hartog, who had been academic registrar of the University of London for 17 years.

Foundation and early days
Established in 1921, under the Dacca University Act 1920 of the Indian Legislative Council, the university is modelled after British universities. Academic activities started on 1 July 1921, with three faculties: Arts, Science, and Law. Classes were taught in 12 Departments: Sanskrit and Bengali, English, Education, History, Arabic and Islamic Studies, Persian and Urdu, Philosophy, Economics and Politics, Physics, Chemistry, Mathematics, and Law. Initially there were three dormitories for students: Salimullah Muslim Hall, Dacca Hall and Jagannath Hall.

Establishment and the British era

The university continued to grow under the direction of leaders including Harry Langley, A. F. Rahman, R. C. Majumdar, and Mahmud Hussain. Under Vice-Chancellor Hussain, the University consolidated its fundamental focus on academics. It also made national headlines when he extended an invitation to then-President of Pakistan, Ayub Khan, who declined citing 'security reasons'. This was the first of many subsequent refusals from high-ranking officials to visit East Pakistan.

Students from 1921 to 1948
There were few students in the early years of the University of Dhaka. Enrollment in the first few years is shown in the table below:

University of Dhaka in the Liberation war (1970s)

Teachers who were killed in 1971
Students and teachers of the University of Dhaka played a vital role in the 1971 Liberation War of Bangladesh. The Ordinance of 1961 was annulled and substituted by the Dacca University Order of 1973., The new Order restored autonomy, and provided a democratic atmosphere for the teachers and students where they could engage freely in academic and intellectual pursuits.

Teachers at the University of Dhaka who were killed during the liberation war include:

References

External links
 University of Dhaka Official website
 History of the Formation of Dhaka University Our Bangla. Retrieved: 2007-07-2

University of Dhaka
Academic institutions associated with the Bengal Renaissance
Dhaka
University of Dhaka